Aaron Louis Perez (born August 28, 1986, in Covina, California) is an American soccer player.

External links
 USL Pro profile
  

1986 births
Living people
American soccer players
UCLA Bruins men's soccer players
OC Pateadores Blues players
Orange County SC players
Minnesota United FC (2010–2016) players
Soccer players from California
USL League Two players
USL Championship players
Association football goalkeepers
American people of Swedish descent
Sportspeople from Los Angeles County, California
People from Covina, California